The 1902 Minnesota gubernatorial election took place on November 4, 1902. Republican Party of Minnesota candidate Samuel Rinnah Van Sant defeated Democratic Party of Minnesota challenger Leonard A. Rosing.

Results

See also
 List of Minnesota gubernatorial elections

External links
 http://www.sos.state.mn.us/home/index.asp?page=653
 http://www.sos.state.mn.us/home/index.asp?page=657

Minnesota
Gubernatorial
1902
November 1902 events